HD 46588 (HR 2401; Gliese 240.1) is a star in the northern circumpolar constellation Camelopardalis. It has an apparent magnitude of 5.44, allowing it to be faintly seen with the naked eye.

HD 46588 is an ordinary F-type main-sequence star with a spectral classification of F7 V. It has 113% the mass of the Sun and 119% its radius. It shines at 182% the luminosity of the Sun from its photosphere at an effective temperature of 6,273 K, giving it a yellow white glow. Isochronic measurements place HD 46588's age at 1.27 billion years, but it's poorly constrained.

Due to the star's close proximity to Earth and similarity to the Sun, it has been well studied by astronomers. No planets have been found, but a brown dwarf companion was discovered in a WISE survey in 2011.

References

Camelopardalis (constellation)
F-type main-sequence stars
046588
032439
2401
Brown dwarfs
Circumstellar disks
BD+79 212
0240.1